is a 1987 American football arcade game developed and published by SNK.

Gameplay
At first glance, it resembles Irem's 1983 arcade game 10 Yard Fight, but with rotating joysticks that were previously used in SNK's Ikari Warriors. Most of the official rules are in effect as well as most major running and passing plays. Field goals and punts are also included, but, players cannot make horse collar tackles.

NES Version
This version featured teams that originated from cities that had NFL teams at the time (such as Seattle and Phoenix) but not the colors or the nicknames. Graphics were toned down as they were for many arcade games ported to the system. The human players could only select 5 basic plays: Long Pass, Short Pass, QB Sneak, Backs (a hand-off) or Punt/Field Goal (Field Goals could only be attempted if the line of scrimmage was within the 15-yard line). Field Goals would always go through the uprights unless blocked by the opposing team. Despite the NFL not adopting this rule until the 1994 season, a player could attempt a 2-point conversion if so desired.

Reception 
In Japan, Game Machine listed Touch Down Fever on their November 1, 1987 issue as being the seventeenth most-successful table arcade unit of the month.

See also
Football Frenzy

References

External links
 Arcade version

Touch Down Fever at arcade-history
Touch Down Fever II at arcade-history
 NES versions

1987 video games
American football video games
Arcade video games
Nintendo Entertainment System games
PlayStation Network games
SNK games
SNK Playmore games
Multiplayer and single-player video games
Video games developed in Japan